The Battle of Ingavi occurred on November 18, 1841, during the Peruvian-Bolivian War of 1841-1842, in the town of  Ingavi, Bolivia. The Bolivian Army, commanded by Jose Ballivian, there met an invading Peruvian Army commanded by Agustín Gamarra, who later died during the battle.

Background
With the dissolution of the Peru-Bolivian Confederation, Peruvian President Agustín Gamarra, made the controversial decision to invade Bolivia and used the political chaos occurring in the Bolivian government as an excuse. Gamarra had from the beginning supported a union between Peru and Bolivia but preferred it to be completely dominated by the Peruvian government, rather than being a confederation between the two nations.

Immediately, Jose Ballivian assumed power in the chaotic state of Bolivia and proclaimed himself president. There were three different governments attempting to rule Bolivia: a legitimate government headquartered in Chuquisaca and headed by José Mariano Serrano, another headquartered in Cochabamba and headed by José Miguel de Velasco, and that of Ballivian headquartered in La Paz.

Faced with the danger of a Peruvian invasion, the three governments joined under Ballivian and readied their armies, which in Ingavi repelled the Peruvians.

Result
On November 18, 1841, with Agustin Gamarra being dead, the Peruvian Army left Bolivia. The news generated chaos in Lima, where Vice-President Manuel Menéndez struggled to maintain his authority. He was soon deposed, with Juan Crisóstomo Torrico assuming power, which allowed order to return to the country. That would be the last attempt of Peru to try to assume control of Bolivia.

The Bolivian Army did not have enough troops to maintain the occupation. In the Battle of Tarapacá (1842), Peruvian montoneros, formed by Major Juan Buendía, from Iquique defeated on January 7, 1842 the detachment led by Colonel José María García, who died in the confrontation. Thus, Bolivian troops vacated Tacna, Arica and Tarapacá in February 1842 and retreated to Moquegua and Puno.

In the battle of Arica the Peruvian militias expel Bolivian troops who wanted to take over the port of Arica.

Motoni and Orurillo batlles evict and subsequently initiate the withdrawal of Bolivian forces that occupied Peruvian territory, again threatening Bolivia to suffer an invasion.

Notes

External links
 Estados Unidos y el mar boliviano
 La Batalla de Ingavi
 Elecciones Perú 2001 - La Confederación Peruano-Boliviana
 Iniciación de la República Peruana

Ingavi
Ingavi
1841 in Bolivia
1841 in military history
November 1841 events
History of La Paz Department (Bolivia)